Amalda jenneri is a species of sea snail, a marine gastropod mollusk in the family Ancillariidae.

Description

Distribution

References

jenneri
Gastropods described in 1977